La Esperanza Frente a Mi is the fourth studio album recorded by American singer Danny Gokey. La Esperanza Frente a Mi was re-recorded in Spanish from the Hope in Front of Me (2014) album. The album was released July 29, 2016 through BMG Rights Management. It was supported by the single "Que Tu Corazón Vuelva a Latir", which was released in promotion of both versions of the album.

Content
La Esperanza Frente a Mi is a track-by-track re-recording of Hope in Front of Me, performed in the Spanish language. Gokey describes the collection as songs that "defined his life" and became the "soundtrack to his mission." The album additionally contains a tropical remix of "Que Tu Corazón Vuelva a Latir" and a salsa remix of "La Esperanza Frente a Mi".

Gokey was inspired to learn Spanish by his late first wife, Sophia, who was latina. He struggled with the language in high school.

Promotion
On May 6, 2016, Gokey released an extended play containing five language-variant versions of the third single from Hope in Front of Me, titled "Tell Your Heart to Beat Again". The collection included the original, a Spanglish version, and a purely Spanish version titled "Que Tu Corazón Vuelva a Latir", in addition to two remixes of the original. While not promoted to the Latin American market, the original English version was a success in the Christian market.

Gokey also premiered the salsa remix of the title track, "La Esperanza Frente a Mi", exclusively on Billboard the day before the album's release, on July 28, 2016.

Track listing

NOTE:  These songs are Spanish-language translations of Danny Gokey songs in English.  The original English-language song is listed next to each title.

Chart performance

References

2016 albums
Danny Gokey albums